Silberstein may refer to:
 Ascher Silberstein (1852-1909), American philanthropist
 August Silberstein (1827–1900), Austrian writer
 Jascha Silberstein (1934-2008), Polish-American musician
 Jerome Silberstein (1924-2005), American lawyer
 Ludwik Silberstein (1872–1948), Polish-American physicist
 Robert Ellis Silberstein (1946–), American music executive
 Solomon Silberstein (1845–1919), Russian-American writer

See also 
 Silverstein

German-language surnames
Jewish surnames
Yiddish-language surnames
Surnames from ornamental names